Michael Collins is an Irish actor, awarded a lifetime achievement award in 2011 for his contribution and work around Travellers' rights.

Filmography

References

External links

Living people
Irish male television actors
Year of birth missing (living people)
Irish Travellers